Niagara Bottling, LLC is a family owned manufacturer of bottled water and soft drinks based in Diamond Bar, California. They produce private label bottled water for a number of companies including Walmart (Great Value), Food Lion, Safeway Inc. (Signature Select), Costco (Kirkland Signature), Sam's Club (Member's Mark), and BJ's (Wellsley Farms). They operate more than 40 bottling plants in both the United States and Mexico, and employs more than 7,000 team members worldwide. As of 2017, Niagara was the largest supplier of private label bottled water in North America.

Company history
The company was founded in 1963 in Irvine, California by Andrew Peykoff Sr. and is currently run by Andy Peykoff II. Niagara began producing private label bottled water in the 1990s and has since gone national. Their private label clients include big box retailers, grocery stores, and convenience stores including Walmart and Costco. In 2017, Niagara bought the bottling component of Pennsylvania based First Quality Water & Beverage. They subsequently closed the bottling plant, but retained the distribution network and private label bottling contracts.

Bottling plants

Mesa, Arizona
Niagara operates a 450,000 sq ft bottling plant in Mesa, Arizona. The plant will have access to 40 million gallons of water a year, the plant can draw water from the Central Arizona Project, Salt River Project, and local groundwater.

Phoenix, Arizona
Niagara operates a 252,000 sq ft bottling plant in Phoenix, Arizona.

Bloomfield, Connecticut
Niagara operates a 400,000 sq ft bottling plant in Bloomfield, Connecticut. The facility receives water from the Metropolitan District Commission and the project has encountered public protest and opposition due to the secrecy with which the deal was brokered and a feeling that water is a public trust that shouldn’t be sold without public consultation.

Groveland, Florida

Jupiter, Florida

Middleburg, Florida
Opened in 2022, located in Middleburg, Florida, just outside of Jacksonville, Florida.

Jeffersonville, Indiana
In 2018 Niagara began construction of a $56 million, 469,000 square foot bottling plant in Jeffersonville, Indiana.

Plainfield, Indiana
Niagara operates a bottling plant in Plainfield, Indiana. In 2018, they spent $62 million to expand the facility.

Byhalia, Mississippi
Opened in 2018, located in Byhalia, Mississippi, just outside of Memphis, Tennessee.

Kansas City, Missouri
In 2019, Niagara invested $68 million to build a 420,000 sq ft bottling plant in Kansas City, Missouri, bringing 50 jobs to the metro area.

Los Lunas, New Mexico
A Niagara bottling plant was opened in Los Lunas, New Mexico in 2016. A 2021 request for more water to expand the plant sparked protests. The request was withdrawn and later renewed in 2022, causing new opposition.

Mooresville, North Carolina
Niagara announced a bottling plant in Mooresville, North Carolina in 2011, for which they received a grant of $200,000 from the One North Carolina fund.

Findlay Township, Pennsylvania
In 2018, Niagara announced plans to build a $64 million bottling plant in Findlay Township, Pennsylvania outside of Pittsburgh.

Florence, South Carolina
In February 2020, Niagara announced plans to build a $70 million bottling plant in the Pee Dee Touchstone Energy Commerce Park northeast of Florence, South Carolina.  Operations are expected to be online by the first quarter of 2021.

Seguin, Texas
In 2019, Niagara add additional infrastructure to their current output. Current Address:1730 8th St, Seguin, TX 78155

Chesterfield County, Virginia
In 2017, Niagara completed a large bottling and warehouse facility in Chesterfield County, Virginia. The facility has 557,000 sq ft on 62 acres and uses 900,000gal of water a day.

Frederickson, Washington
311,000-square-foot bottling facility opened in Frederickson, Washington in 2014.

See also
 Nestlé Waters North America
 List of bottled water brands

References

External links
 Official website

Drink companies of the United States
Drink companies of Mexico
Drink companies based in California
Bottled water brands
Privately held companies based in California